Thomas Dawson (6 February 1915 – 20 December 1972) was an English professional footballer who played as an inside forward in the Football League. He later moved to Australia and managed Adamstown Rosebud.

Career statistics

References

External links

1915 births
1972 deaths
English footballers
Footballers from Middlesbrough
Association football forwards
Charlton Athletic F.C. players
Whitby Town F.C. players
Darlington F.C. players
Spennymoor United F.C. players
Brentford F.C. players
Swindon Town F.C. players
English Football League players
Chippenham Town F.C. players
Chippenham Town F.C. managers
English expatriate sportspeople in Australia
English expatriate football managers
FA Cup Final players